Those People Next Door is a 1953 British second feature comedy film directed by John Harlow and starring Jack Warner, Charles Victor and Marjorie Rhodes.

Plot
In Second World War era Britain, working-class Sam Twigg (Jack Warner) and his wife Mary (Marjorie Rhodes) are raising their family in the shadow of the Blitz.
Their next door neighbours Joe (Charles Victor) and Emma (Gladys Henson) practically live in the Twiggs’ house, borrowing cups of sugar or using their Anderson shelter. Controversy arises when Sam's pretty daughter Anne (Patricia Cutts) becomes romantically involved with RAF officer Victor Stevens (Peter Forbes-Robertson). There is disapproval from Victor's wealthy parents, Sir Andrew and Lady Stevens (Garry Marsh and Grace Arnold), who object to the match on grounds of class. Lady Stevens even offers money to the Twigg family to call off the relationship, which enrages father Sam. However, when RAF man Victor is reportedly shot down in action, parental attitudes soften.

Cast
 Jack Warner ...  Sam Twigg
 Charles Victor ...  Joe Higgins
 Marjorie Rhodes ...  Mary Twigg
 Gladys Henson ...  Emma Higgins
 Garry Marsh ...  Sir Andrew Stevens
 Jimmy James ...  Drunk
 Patricia Cutts ...  Anne Twigg
 Peter Forbes-Robertson ...  Victor Stevens
 Anthony Newley ...  Bob Twigg
 Grace Arnold ...  Lady Stevens
 Norah Gorsen ...  Margaret Twigg
 Geoffrey Sumner ...  F / Lt Claude Kimberley

Critical reception
Sky Movies gave the film three out of five stars, and wrote, "The Rank Organisation had unexpectedly boosted its bank balance with comedies about the cockney Hugget family (starring Jack Warner and Kathleen Harrison) in post-war years, but decided to end the series after four films. Unconvinced that this vein of comedy had been mined out, producer Tom Blakeley's Manchester-based film unit, which had made Frank Randle comedies in the war years, took an old play set in 1941, hired Jack Warner and a good cast and let rip. Unfortunately, the characters were too unsympathetic and the piece still ran like a play, but the same distributors had better luck a couple of years later when they reunited Warner with Kathleen Harrison in Home and Away."

References

External links

1953 films
1953 comedy films
Films directed by John Harlow
British comedy films
British black-and-white films
Films shot in Greater Manchester
1950s English-language films
1950s British films